"Safari" is a song by Colombian singer J Balvin from his studio album, Energía (2016). Featuring vocals from American singer Pharrell Williams, Puerto Rican rapper Bia and his frequent record producer Sky, the track was released by Capitol Latin on 17 June 2016 as the album's third single. It was written by J Balvin, Bia, Alejandro Ramírez, Jesse Huerta, and Williams, who also produced the song. The song reached number one in Mexico, Panama and Spain. 

This song also appeared on the soundtrack of the series Súper X in Este cuerpo no es mío.

Reception
Pitchfork described the song as "a thrilling joint, driven by bongos and a snaking piano line".

Charts

Weekly charts

Monthly charts

Year-end charts

Certifications

See also
List of number-one songs of 2016 (Mexico)
List of Billboard number-one Latin songs of 2016

References

2016 songs
2016 singles
J Balvin songs
Pharrell Williams songs
Bia (rapper) songs
Capitol Latin singles
Songs written by Pharrell Williams
Songs written by J Balvin